Ningxia University is a public university located in Yinchuan, China. It is co-administrated by Ningxia Hui Autonomous Region and Ministry of Education of the People's Republic of China. It is a member of the former Project 211 and a Chinese state Double First Class University, included in the Double First Class University Plan identified by the Ministry of Education.

The school was founded in 1958. In the end of 1997, Ningxia Institute of Technology and Yinchuan Normal College (including Ningxia Education College) were merged into the university. In February 2002, it was merged with Ningxia Agricultural College, and formed the new Ningxia University.

It currently comprises three campuses. It consists of more than 2,600 teachers and staff, over 50% of them are formal instructors. More than half of the instructors hold intermediate to senior titles, 52% of them with masters or doctors degrees. 15 teachers receives special subsidies of the State Council, and 17 were elected into "National Hundreds, Thousands, Tens of Thousands Experts Project". It enrolls more than 15,000 undergraduates and over 1,300 graduates. More than 600 are minority preparatory students.

References

External links

Official website of Ningxia University 

 
Universities and colleges in Ningxia
Education in Yinchuan
Universities and colleges formed by merger in China
Educational institutions established in 2002